Non-Stop Mix Best is a 1998 album by 2 Unlimited, a Eurodance project founded in 1991 by Belgian producers Jean-Paul DeCoster and Phil Wilde and fronted by Dutch rapper Ray Slijngaard and Dutch vocalist Anita Doth.

Album information
This album contains 18 tracks by 2 Unlimited. Included are tracks from all four vocalists to front the band, Romy van Ooijen, Marjon van Iwaarden, Anita Doth and Ray Slijngaard — all included in a 16 track continuous mix by DJ John Robinson. The final two tracks are remixes of European hits "Wanna Get Up" and "Edge of Heaven".

Release history
Non-Stop Mix Best was released in 1998 exclusively in Japan through Mercury Records.

Track listing
 Get Ready for This (800 Mix)
 Twilight Zone (Rapping Rave Version)
 The Magic Friend (Rio & Le Jean Mix)
 Workaholic
 Delight
 Tribal Dance (Extended)
 Wanna Get Up (Sash! Extended Mix) 
 Move On Up
 The Edge Of Heaven
 Let's Celebrate
 I Am Ready
 Never Surrender
 Be Free Tonight
 No Limit (7" Rap Version)
 Let the Beat Control Your Body
 The Real Thing (Extended)
 Wanna Get Up (Rhythm Masters Remix)
 The Edge Of Heaven (Highlight Over The Edge Remix)

References

2 Unlimited albums
1998 albums